Ian Wendell Walcott is a Barbadian diplomat. He is Barbadian ambassador to the Republic of Nicaragua. He previously served as the Barbadian ambassador to the Republic of Panama.

References 

Living people
Year of birth missing (living people)
Barbadian diplomats
Ambassadors of Barbados to Nicaragua